Alamanda Motuga (born 11 September 1994 in Samoa) is a Samoan rugby union and rugby sevens player who plays as a flanker.

Motuga was educated at Manurewa High School in Auckland, New Zealand. He began playing rugby for Manurewa in the Counties-Manukau Amateur Federation Championship. He also played rugby sevens with the Auckland Marist team.

In February 2016 he was selected for the Samoa national rugby sevens team to play in the Las Vegas and Vancouver legs of the 2015–16 World Rugby Sevens Series. In May 2016 he was part of the Samoan team that won the 2016 Paris Sevens. He went on to represent Samoa in 36 sevens competitions from 2016. In July 2019 he was selected for the Samoa national rugby union team for the 2019 World Rugby Pacific Nations Cup, making his debut for the national side against Tonga. He performances for Samoa and Samoa Sevens earned him a call-up to the Samoa squad for the 2019 Rugby World Cup as a replacement for Afa Amosa.

In 2020 he joined the  squad for the 2020 Mitre 10 Cup. In November 2020 he represented Moana Pasifika in their inaugural match against the Māori All Blacks. In October 2021 he signed to Moana Pacifica for the 2022 season.

Reference list

External links 
 
Rugby World Cup profile

1994 births
Samoan rugby union players
Samoa international rugby union players
Living people
Rugby union flankers
Moana Pasifika players
Counties Manukau rugby union players